The Platzer Kiebitz is a German amateur-built aircraft designed by Michael Platzer and made available in the form of plans for amateur construction.

Design and development
The Kiebitz features a strut-braced biplane configuration, a two-seats-in-tandem open cockpit with a small windshield, fixed conventional landing gear and a single engine in tractor configuration.

The aircraft fuselage is made from welded steel tubing, with its flying surfaces covered in doped aircraft fabric. Engines from  can be used. The prototype used a  Nissan 12P automotive engine from a Nissan Micra, but Rotax, Volkswagen air-cooled engines and Sauer powerplants have also been employed.

Operational history
Even though the aircraft can only be constructed from plans, the Kiebitz has proven popular with builders for the European Fédération Aéronautique Internationale microlight class.

Specifications (Kiebitz)

References

External links

Homebuilt aircraft
Biplanes
Single-engined tractor aircraft
German sport aircraft